Menstrual migraine (also called catamenial migraine) is term used to describe both true menstrual migraines and menstrually related migraines. About 7%–14% of women have migraines only at the time of menstruation, these are called true menstrual migraines. Most female migraneurs experience migraine attacks throughout the menstruation cycle with an increased number perimenstrually, these are referred to as menstrually related or menstrually triggered migraine.

It used to believed that treatments for migraine would work in menstrual migraine but that has not proven to be the case because menstrual migraines are harder to treat. Because of this, menstrual migraines are now considered a separate medical disorder from migraine. In 2008, menstrual migraines were given ICD-9 codes (346.4-346.43) of their own which separate menstrual migraine from other types of migraine.

About 40% of women and 20% of men will get a migraine at sometime in their life; most of them will get their first migraine before they are 35-years-old. Menstrual-related migraines happen in more than 50 percent of women who have migraine headaches. Menstrual migraine attacks usually last longer than other migraine attacks, and short-term treatments do not work as well with menstrual migraine as they do in other kinds of migraine. They are usually migraines without aura, but in 2012 a case of menstrual migraine with aura was reported, so it is possible. Auras are a kind of condition which affect certain parts of the brain, usually the parts that control vision but they can also affect the parts of the brain which control the other senses like touch, motor control (moving parts of the body) and the parts of the brain that control speech.

Signs and symptoms

Warning symptoms 

Warning symptoms also called prodrome symptoms often happen before a migraine attack.
 Sleepiness
 Fatigue
 Depression (feeling sad), euphoria (feeling very happy) or irritability
 Restlessness
 Excessive (too much) yawning
 Food cravings especially for sweet or salty foods or loss of appetite
 Increased thirst
 Diarrhea
 Nausea
 Bloating: the body retains (keeps) too much water
 Neck stiffness
 Talkativeness (talking too much)
 Feeling light-headed
 Uterine pain and cramping

Headache 
A pounding throbbing headache with the pain being on one side of the head (unilateral). The side of the head that has the pain changes from one headache to the next.

Associated conditions 
Often, having one medical condition makes it more likely a person will also have one or more other medical or psychiatric disorders. These other disorders are the "comorbid disorders" or "comorbidities". There are various comorbid medical and psychiatric conditions associated with migraines. The treatment and prognosis (if a disease gets better, worse or stays the same over time) of migraine is affected by the comorbid disorders which may be present and/or the chance of getting comorbid disorders.
 Asthma – Premenstrual asthma (PMA): is when asthma symptoms get worse during the premenstrual period. This condition may affect up to 40% of females with asthma. For a diagnosis of PMA to be made it is necessary to have a detailed history of the timing of menstrual cycles along with asthma symptoms experienced, and the peak expiratory flow rate (PMA may cause the PEF to be lowered in the premenstrual period). It is helpful in making a diagnosis to keep a diary of symptoms and peak expiratory flow (PEF) rates.
 Raynaud's disease: is a circulatory disorder in which the smaller arteries that supply blood to the extremities – most often the hands, but it may also affect the, toes, the tip of the nose and the ears – become narrower reducing blood flow. This causes the extremities to become numb and to be cooler than the core body temperature. It can be triggered by exposure to stress and cold.
 Epilepsy
 Fibromyalgia

It is associated with a number of mental health conditions including
 Major depressive disorder
 Anxiety
 Bipolar disorder

Causes 
The exact causes of menstrual migraine are not known for sure but there is a link between falling levels of the female hormone estrogen and the onset of a migraine attack. The estrogen level may fall after bleeding occurs during the menstrual cycle or when external sources of estrogen are no longer taken, like when a woman stops taking birth control pills or hormone pills in hormone replacement therapy.

Diagnosis 
The diagnosis of a menstrual migraine is made by keeping track of when the migraines occur for a period of at least three months. Menstrually related migraine attacks occur usually between 2 days before and 3 days after the start of menstruation in at least 2 out of 3 menstrual cycles (periods) in a row. Pure menstrual migraine and menstrually related migraine are both migraines without auras with one exceptionally rare case with aura reported in 2012.

The Menstrual Migraine Assessment Tool (MMAT) is a simple questionnaire with three questions, that has shown to be fairly accurate in diagnosing menstrual migraine (Tepper SJ, 2008). The three questions are:

 Do migraines occur in the space of time 2 days before the beginning of a woman's period, until the third day after the start of the period. And does this happen in most months.
 Do headaches that happen during this time become very severe.
 Does the woman experience photophobia which is when a medical problem cause light to bother a person's eyes.

The answer to the first question has to be yes and there has to be at least one yes answer to either question 2 or question 3.

In order to keep track of what time of the month the migraines happen it is helpful to use a headache diary. A person uses the headache diary to write down information about their headaches, like when they started, what kind of symptoms they had and how bad the pain was etc.

Prevention 

There are treatments which may decrease the severity or frequency of menstrual migraines. Preventative treatments for menstrual migraine should be tried for at least 3 menstruation cycles to determine effectiveness.

Medications used may include:
 NSAIDS (nonsteroidal antiinflammatory drugs) such as naproxen
 Beta blockers—such as propranolol, nadolol, atenolol, and metoprolol
 Tricyclic antidepressants (TCAs) and other kinds of antidepressant medications are often used for migraine prevention. These include amitriptyline, nortriptyline, and doxepin.

Treatment 
Acute treatments (short-term treatment) include drugs called Nonsteroidal anti-inflammatory drugs (NSAIDS) (drugs that help stop inflammation which is redness, swelling, pain, tenderness, heat in parts of the body), triptans such as Frovatriptan, ergotomines which are a kind of drug made from a fungus called ergot, and estrogen transdermal patches, which are patches worn on the skin that have estrogen in them which enters the body through the skin and then into the bloodstream.

See also 
Catamenial epilepsy
Catamenial pneumothorax

References

External links 
 Optimizing Management of Menstrual Migraine

Migraine